Christopher Stone (born 11 May 1951) is a former English cricketer. Stone was a right-handed batsman who was a right-arm off break bowler.

Stone made his county cricket debut for Bedfordshire in the 1974 Minor Counties Championship against Cambridgeshire. Stone played 8 Minor Counties matches for Bedfordshire in the 1974 season, with his final match for the county coming against Buckinghamshire.

Stone made his debut for Dorset in the 1982 Minor Counties Championship against Cornwall. From 1982 to 1990 Stone represented Dorset in 76 Minor Counties matches, with his final match coming against Buckinghamshire.

Stone also played 5 List-A cricket matches for Dorset, with his debut List-A match coming against Essex in the 1st round of the 1983 NatWest Trophy. Stone played 4 further List-A matches for Dorset, with his final List-A match for the county coming in the 1st round of the 1990 NatWest Trophy against Glamorgan.

External links
Christopher Stone at Cricinfo
Christopher Stone at CricketArchive

1951 births
Living people
People from St Neots
English cricketers
Bedfordshire cricketers
Dorset cricketers